There are two types of Utah State Legislature districts.

Utah State Senate districts 
The state is divided into 29 Senate districts, each representing approximately 100,000 people (estimated in 2018 from 2010 census).

State House districts 
The House is divided into 75 House districts, each representing approximately 40,000 people.

See also
 Utah's congressional districts (for districts at the national level)

Utah Legislature